Hattersville is the name of a former hamlet in eastern Dallas County, Texas.

Boyd Hatter originally settled the hamlet and founded a school in the area. In 1953, the hamlet was merged with the nearby towns of Long Creek, Tripp, and New Hope to create the town of Sunnyvale, Texas.

References

External links 
 

Sunnyvale, Texas